This list of tallest buildings in Chihuahua ranks skyscrapers in  Mexico, city of Chihuahua, Chihuahua by height.
The tallest structure in the city is the tronera avalos, which rises , in avalos district.
The tallest building in Chihuahua is the  cenit tower, which rises  in Chihuahua juventud  and was completed in 2012.
In Downtown Chihuahua is the second tallest building the legislature building which rises  and was completed in 1973 becoming one of tallest building in the country.

Tallest buildings
This list ranks Chihuahua skyscrapers that stand at least 65 feet (20 m) tall.
An equal sign (=) following a rank indicates the same height between two or more buildings.
Freestanding observation and/or telecommunication towers, while not habitable buildings, are included for comparison purposes; however, they are not ranked.

Approved and proposed

Approved and under construction

Proposed

References

General
 Emporis.com - Chihuahua city
  Emporis.com - tallest buildings in Chihuahua city

Specific
 Asta bandera el palomar
 legislature building
 palacio del sol hotel
 telmex tower
 punto alto 2
 guizar building
 The Angel of Liberty
 punto alto
 tribunales federales building
 fiesta inn
 soberano hotel
 justice center
 Asta bandera

Buildings and structures in Chihuahua (state)
Buildings
ChihuahuaCity